St Peter Martyr with St Nicholas and St Benedict is an oil on canvas painting by Cima da Conegliano, created c. 1505–1506, now in the Pinacoteca di Brera in Milan. It references the sacra conversazione pieces by Giovanni Bellini, whilst the landscape shows the artist as an early adopter of the new style of Giorgione.

The work was commissioned by the spice merchant Benedetto Carlone for the chapel dedicated to St Peter Martyr in Corpus Domini, a church in Venice, where he planned to be buried. It shows the saint dressed in Dominican habit. The church was suppressed under the Napoleonic occupation of Italy and the painting arrived in Brera in 1811.

References

Paintings by Cima da Conegliano
Paintings in the collection of the Pinacoteca di Brera
Paintings of Peter of Verona
Paintings of Saint Nicholas
Paintings of Benedict of Nursia
1506 paintings